La Crescenta-Montrose is an unincorporated area in Los Angeles County, California, United States. The community is bordered by Glendale to the south and west, La Cañada Flintridge to the east, and Angeles National Forest to the north.

Geography
La Crescenta-Montrose encompasses those parts of the Crescenta Valley, northwestern San Rafael Hills, and northeastern Verdugo Mountains not within the cities of Glendale or La Cañada Flintridge. For statistical purposes, the United States Census Bureau has defined La Crescenta-Montrose as a CDP.

La Crescenta-Montrose is bordered on the north by the San Gabriel Mountains and Angeles National Forest, on the east by La Cañada Flintridge, on the south by the Verdugo Mountains and central Glendale, and the northwest by the Sunland-Tujunga community of Los Angeles. The Foothill Freeway (I-210) runs through the southern portion of the area.

Demographics

U.S. Census

2010
The 2010 United States Census reported that La Crescenta-Montrose had a population of 19,653. The racial makeup of La Crescenta-Montrose was 12,807 (65.2%) White (57.9% Non-Hispanic White), 142 (0.7%) African American, 70 (0.4%) Native American, 5,375 (27.3%) Asian, 12 (0.1%) Pacific Islander, 533 (2.7%) from other races, and 714 (3.6%) from two or more races. Hispanic or Latino of any race were 2,232 persons (11.4%).

The Census reported that 19,652 people (100% of the population) lived in households, 1 (0%) lived in non-institutionalized group quarters, and 0 (0%) were institutionalized.

There were 7,088 households, out of which 2,700 (38.1%) had children under the age of 18 living in them, 4,190 (59.1%) were opposite-sex married couples living together, 784 (11.1%) had a female householder with no husband present, 298 (4.2%) had a male householder with no wife present. There were 212 (3.0%) unmarried opposite-sex partnerships, and 42 (0.6%) same-sex married couples or partnerships. 1,533 households (21.6%) were made up of individuals, and 555 (7.8%) had someone living alone who was 65 years of age or older. The average household size was 2.77. There were 5,272 families (74.4% of all households); the average family size was 3.26.

The population distribution was 4,612 people (23.5%) under the age of 18, 1,635 people (8.3%) aged 18 to 24, 4,590 people (23.4%) aged 25 to 44, 6,388 people (32.5%) aged 45 to 64, and 2,428 people (12.4%) who were 65 years of age or older. The median age was 41.6 years. For every 100 females, there were 92.9 males. For every 100 females age 18 and over, there were 89.8 males.

The homeowner vacancy rate was 0.6%; the rental vacancy rate was 4.1%. 13,478 people (68.6% of the population) lived in owner-occupied housing units and 6,174 people (31.4%) lived in rental housing units.

According to the 2010 United States Census, La Crescenta-Montrose had a median household income of $89,375, with 7.4% of the population living below the federal poverty line.

2000
As of the census of 2000, there were 18,532 people, 6,945 households, and 4,944 families residing in the CDP. The racial makeup of the CDP was 72.93% White, 0.52% African American, 0.36% Native American, 18.68% Asian, 0.04% Pacific Islander, 2.69% from other races, and 4.78% from two or more races. Hispanic or Latino of any race were 9.91% of the population.

There were 6,945 households, out of which 37.7% had children under the age of 18 living with them, 57.4% were married couples living together, 10.0% had a female householder with no husband present, and 28.8% were non-families. 24.5% of all households were made up of individuals, and 7.9% had someone living alone who was 65 years of age or older. The average household size was 2.66 and the average family size was 3.22.

In the CDP the population was spread out, with 26.5% under the age of 18, 6.4% from 18 to 24, 29.9% from 25 to 44, 25.8% from 45 to 64, and 11.4% who were 65 years of age or older. The median age was 39 years. For every 100 females, there were 93.7 males. For every 100 females age 18 and over, there were 90.9 males.

The median income for a household in the CDP was $60,089, and the median income for a family was $69,381. Males had a median income of $60,027 versus $38,532 for females. The per capita income for the CDP was $30,196. About 3.9% of families and 5.3% of the population were below the poverty line, including 6.3% of those under age 18 and 5.6% of those age 65 or over.

Mapping L.A.
In 2009, the Los Angeles Timess Mapping L.A. project supplied these neighborhood statistics based on the 2000 census.

The percentages of Asian and white people in La Crescenta-Montrose were high for the county. Median income at $82,693 was high for the county, The percentages of households that earned $60,000 to $125,000 and $125,000 and up were high for the county. 40.8% of residents 25 and older had a four-year degree, high for the county. The percentages of residents ages 35 to 49 and 50 to 64 were among the county's highest. The single-parent rate was 8.8 percent, low for the county. The percentage of veterans who served during Vietnam was among the county's highest.Comparison of La Crescenta-Montrose with nearby neighborhoodsMost percentages are rounded to the nearest whole figure.

Education
Schools in La Crescenta-Montrose are a part of the Glendale Unified School District.Elementary schools La Crescenta Elementary School - California Distinguished School 2008
 Dunsmore Elementary School - California Distinguished School 2008
 John C. Fremont Elementary School (Glendale) - California Distinguished School 2006
 Abraham Lincoln Elementary School
 Monte Vista Elementary School - Blue Ribbon School 2005
 Mountain Avenue Elementary School - Blue Ribbon School 2005
 Valley View Elementary School- Blue Ribbon School 2005Middle schools Rosemont Middle School- California Distinguished SchoolHigh schools Crescenta Valley High School - California Distinguished School 2005, Blue Ribbon School 2000
 Clark Magnet - California Distinguished School 2005 Blue Ribbon School 2007Independent study Verdugo Academy (K-12)
 Options For Youth Public Charter Schools (7-12)Private'''
 Armenian Sisters Academy (TK-8)
 Chamlian Armenian School (TK-8)
 Holy Redeemer-St. James the Less Catholic School (TK-8)
 St Monica's academy (TK-8)
 Crescenta Valley Adventist School (K-8)
 Montrose Christian Montessori School (Pre-6)

Government
In the state legislature, La Crescenta-Montrose is situated in the 25th senate district, represented by Senator Carol Liu, and the 43rd assembly district, represented by Assemblywoman Laura Friedman. The area is in California's 28th congressional district, represented by Congressman Adam Schiff.

The Los Angeles County Sheriff's Department (LASD) operates the Crescenta Valley Station in La Crescenta, serving La Crescenta and Montrose.

History
The area is part of the homelands of the Tongva people. It became part of Rancho La Cañada, a Mexican land grant given in 1843 by Governor Manuel Micheltorena to a Mexican schoolteacher from Pueblo de Los Ángeles, Ygnacio Coronel (1795–1862).

La Crescenta does not mean "the crescent," which in Spanish would be el creciente. From his home, early settler Benjamin B. Briggs "could see three crescent-shaped formations, which suggested to him the artificial name," accepted by the U.S. Post Office in 1888. Montrose was chosen "as the result of a contest for the subdivision established in 1913 on part of the La Crescenta development.

The Great Flood of 1934

In November 1933, wildfires raged through the nearby San Gabriel mountains above the communities of La Crescenta, La Cañada and Montrose. On New Year's Eve, more heavy rains led to sporadic flooding.

Around midnight, hillsides in at least three mountain locations collapsed sending millions of tons of mud and debris into the Crescenta Valley neighborhoods below.

More than 400 homes were destroyed in La Cañada, La Crescenta, Montrose and Tujunga. Scores of people were killed, and hundreds were left homeless. Entire families were wiped out. The mudslides that began in the mountains above La Cañada and La Crescenta carved a path of destruction all the way to the Verdugo Wash and beyond.Some Montrose residents sought shelter from flooding at American Legion Post 288, which was destroyed, killing 12.
Parts of Foothill Boulevard were buried under  of mud, boulders and debris. The mud was deep enough to bury cars completely on Montrose Avenue. Miles of Honolulu Boulevard were inundated by several feet of sand and silt.

Two notable victims of the flood were silent-era identical-twin child actors Winston and Weston Doty, who died at the age of 19.San Antonio Light (San Antonio, Texas) January 20, 1934 pg. 3

Following the disaster, the U.S. Army Corps of Engineers and the County of Los Angeles built a flood control system of catch basins and concrete storm drains, designed to prevent a repeat of the 1934 disaster.

The flood was commemorated in Woody Guthrie's song "Los Angeles New Year's Flood". To honor the victims of that New Year's calamity and to mark its 75th anniversary, a small monument was dedicated January 1, 2004, at Rosemont and Fairway avenues in Montrose, near where the American Legion Hall had stood.

 In popular culture 
In the spring of 2012, a black bear wandered regularly from the Angeles National Forest into the La Crescenta-Montrose-Glendale residential area, rummaging through trash cans and showing a preference for Costco meatballs and tuna. The bear was subdued in La Crescenta and returned to the forest. A Twitter account from an individual posting as "GlenBearian" appeared with updates from the bear's perspective.

The historic 1946 La Crescenta Motel, formerly known as the May Lane Motel, with its classic postwar L-shaped layout on Foothill Boulevard, has been used as a location for numerous feature films and television shows, such as Glee, Criminal Minds, Mad Men and True Blood.

Rockhaven Sanitarium on Honolulu Avenue, built entirely of rock, opened in 1923. It became known as the "Screen Actors' Sanitarium," housing such patients as Billie Burke and Gladys Baker, mother of Marilyn Monroe. Closed in 2006, the property was purchased by the City of Glendale in 2008. As of early 2016, the site is being considered for "adaptive reuse."

Another, more notorious sanitarium existed in La Crescenta from the 1920s to the early 1960s. A few yards west of the La Crescenta Motel, on the corner of Foothill Boulevard and Rosemont Avenue, is the site of the Kimball Sanitarium, which was housed in a large, foreboding, converted Victorian mansion built in the 1880s. Bela Lugosi attempted to overcome his morphine addiction at the Kimball, represented in the Tim Burton film Ed Wood. Actress Frances Farmer, misdiagnosed as a "paranoid schizophrenic," received insulin shock therapy at Kimball. Plans to expand the sanitarium were rejected by local residents in the early 1960s, and the sanitarium was torn down. Construction workers readying the building for demolition found padded cells with straitjackets and manacles attached to the walls. The site became a shopping plaza in 1989, and a Ralphs supermarket occupies the spot where the disreputable sanitarium once stood.

During a bipolar episode in 1996, actress Margot Kidder attempted to walk  from downtown Los Angeles to the La Crescenta home of a friend, writer Rosie Shuster. Kidder was discovered in Glendale and hospitalized.

Government and infrastructure

Crescenta Valley Town Council
The Crescenta Valley Town Council (CVTC) is composed of nine democratically elected councilmembers, each of whom serve three-year terms upon installation. CVTC is currently the Los Angeles County unincorporated area's main advisory body to the county supervisor's office and other governing agencies, as well as an organized institution that is often counted on to facilitate community-wide forums to inform or garner opinion from residents.

Health
The Los Angeles County Department of Health Services operates the Glendale Health Center in Glendale, serving La Crescenta and Montrose.

USC Verdugo Hills Hospital is a 158-bed nonprofit primary-care facility. It features emergency services, inpatient and outpatient diagnostic and treatment facilities, a family birthing center, and bariatric and orthopedic surgical services.

Media
La Crescenta and Crescenta Valley area is served by the Crescenta Valley Weekly newspaper and the Glendale News Press.

Points of historical interest
St. Luke's of the Mountains Episcopal Church was designed and built by the famous artist Seymour Thomas in 1924. Constructed of natural stone from the valley, it is reminiscent of a woodlands church in northern Europe. It is considered to be the architectural centerpiece of the valley. St. Luke's is located at 2563 Foothill Boulevard.Le Mesnager'' Barn is a stone barn perched high above the valley, built in 1911 by George Le Mesnager, a French patriot, to store and process grapes from his vineyards in the Sparr Heights area. These grapes supplied his Old Hermatage Vinyards in downtown Los Angeles. There is still a Mesnager Street in the downtown area where the winery had been located. It is owned by the City of Glendale, which plans to restore it as an educational nature/history center. Le Mesnager Barn is located in Deukmejian Wilderness Park at the top of Dunsmore Ave.

La Crescenta is home to one of two American ashrams founded by Indian teacher and mystic poet Swami Paramananda who came to America in 1906. Founded in 1923, the Ananda Ashram is located at the top of Pennsylvania Avenue near Deukmejian Wilderness Park.

The La Crescenta Woman's Club began in 1911, incorporated in 1923, and built its clubhouse in 1925. The structure, the social center of the valley for most of the last century, is the home for the organization's many charitable and social events. The La Crescenta Woman's Club is located at 4004 La Crescenta Avenue.

Sparr Heights Community Center was built early in 1922 by William S. Sparr as the real estate office for the Sparr Heights residential tract, originally named Oakmont Park. It was donated to the City of Glendale on December 24, 1922, and has been a community meeting place and senior center since then. Sparr Heights Community Center is located at 1613 Glencoe Way, across the street from John C. Fremont Elementary School.

La Crescenta Elementary School was built in 1887 at the corner of Foothill and Dyer, but soon moved to a new location at La Crescenta and Prospect. A wooden schoolhouse was built on this site in 1890. A larger school building replaced it in 1914, and the present structure was erected in 1948.

The Old School Bell: La Crescenta's school bell first rang students to school from across the valley in 1890. It was placed in storage from 1948 until 1976 when it was re-hung and dedicated with a plaque listing the names of the children in the first class at La Crescenta Elementary. The bell, located in front of La Crescenta Elementary School, is rung once a year in June by the graduating students.

La Crescenta Presbyterian Church is a striking church building constructed in 1923. This is one of the older congregations in the valley, first meeting in the 1880s. In the congregation's early years, it shared facilities with the elementary school as did the Episcopals that later built St. Luke's. La Crescenta Presbyterian Church is located at 2902 Montrose Avenue.

See also

 M.V. Hartranft, an early developer of Montrose

References

External links

 Official Crescenta Valley Chamber website
 Historical Society of the Crescenta Valley
 Montrose Chamber of Commerce Oktoberfest

Census-designated places in Los Angeles County, California
Crescenta Valley
Neighborhoods in Glendale, California
San Rafael Hills
Verdugo Mountains
Unincorporated communities in Los Angeles County, California
Unincorporated communities in California